Gaurav Yadav (born 31 October 1991) is an Indian cricketer. He made his first-class debut for Madhya Pradesh in the 2012–13 Ranji Trophy on 2 November 2012. He was the joint-leading wicket-taker in the 2019–20 Vijay Hazare Trophy tournament, with twenty-three dismissals in nine matches. He made his Twenty20 debut on 9 November 2019, for Madhya Pradesh in the 2019–20 Syed Mushtaq Ali Trophy.

References

External links
 

1991 births
Living people
Indian cricketers
Madhya Pradesh cricketers
People from Hoshangabad